ISES may refer to:

 International Solar Energy Society
 International Society of Exposure Science